In graph theory, the Gyárfás–Sumner conjecture asks whether, for every tree  and complete graph , the graphs with neither  nor  as induced subgraphs can be properly colored using only a constant number of colors. Equivalently, it asks whether the -free graphs are -bounded.
It is named after András Gyárfás and David Sumner, who formulated it independently in 1975 and 1981 respectively. It remains unproven.

In this conjecture, it is not possible to replace  by a graph with cycles. As Paul Erdős and András Hajnal have shown, there exist graphs with arbitrarily large chromatic number and, at the same time, arbitrarily large girth. Using these graphs, one can obtain graphs that avoid any fixed choice of a cyclic graph and clique (of more than two vertices) as induced subgraphs, and exceed any fixed bound on the chromatic number.

References

External links
Graphs with a forbidden induced tree are chi-bounded, Open Problem Garden

Graph coloring
Conjectures
Unsolved problems in graph theory